The 1997 Formula Nippon Championship was contested over 10 rounds. 17 different teams, 37 different drivers, 3 different chassis and 2 different engines competed.

Teams and drivers

Calendar

Note:

Race 2 first finisher Norberto Fontana 1'21:51.024/147.209 km/h, but 1 minute penalty.

(ss) indicate the winner of the special stage, who started from pole - (fq) indicate the original fastest qualifier. In all other races, the fastest qualifier was also the winner of the special stage.

Championship standings

Drivers' Championship
Scoring system

Teams' Championship

External links
1997 Japanese Championship Formula Nippon

Formula Nippon
Super Formula
Nippon